Baoshan Yunrui Airport is an airport in Baoshan, Yunnan, China.

Airlines and destinations

See also
List of airports in the People's Republic of China

References

External links
Yunnan Airport Group

Airports in Yunnan
Transport in Baoshan, Yunnan